Manuel García-Rulfo Lapuente (born February 25, 1981) known professionally as Manuel Garcia-Rulfo, is a Mexican actor. He is best known for roles in films such as Cake and Bless Me, Ultima, as well as the television program From Dusk till Dawn: The Series. He starred as one of the titular characters in the 2016 remake The Magnificent Seven.

Early life 
García-Rulfo was born in Guadalajara, Jalisco, Mexico. He grew up on a ranch in Jalisco, where he learned to ride horses. At one point, he went to Vermont to study English. He attended Universidad del Valle de Atemajac where he majored in communications before he realized his interest in filmmaking. He studied at the New York Film Academy, but decided to return to Mexico to continue his acting career.

Career 
Garcia-Rulfo made his first major American film with Bless Me, Ultima, as Uncle Pedro. In 2016, he played the outlaw Vasquez, one of the title characters, in The Magnificent Seven remake. The role required him to take up gun training, which he thought was difficult, though he stated, "I got blisters, but it was hilarious." In 2017, he co-starred in Kenneth Branagh's adaptation of Murder on the Orient Express, playing Biniamino Marquez, a character who originated in the novel as Antonio Foscarelli and was adapted specifically for him.

In early 2021, García-Rulfo was cast as Mickey Haller in a television adaptation of The Lincoln Lawyer for Netflix, replacing Logan Marshall-Green.

Filmography

Film

Television

References

External links

Mexican male actors
Male actors from Guadalajara, Jalisco
Living people
1981 births